The Gaon Album Chart is a record chart that ranks the best-selling albums and EPs in South Korea. It is part of the Gaon Music Chart which launched in February 2010. The data for the chart is compiled by the Ministry of Culture, Sports and Tourism and the Korean Music Content Industry Association based on weekly and monthly physical albums and digital sales by six major distributors: LOEN Entertainment, S.M. Entertainment, Sony Music Korea, Warner Music Korea, Universal Music and Mnet Media.

Overall, BTS' album Wings was Gaon Album Chart best selling album of 2016, selling 751,301 copies in a year. With Wings, BTS breaks the highest-selling album ever recorded on Gaon Music Chart since the chart’s inception in 2010. Five months earlier, BTS' album The Most Beautiful Moment in Life: Young Forever already topped Gaon Album Chart second place for the first half of 2016, selling 368,369 copies overall at the end of the year. BTS earned Artist of The Year at 2016 Mnet Asian Music Awards, Album of The Year at 2016 Melon Music Awards, Album of The Year (4th Quarter) at 6th Gaon Chart Music Awards and Disk Bonsang at 31st Golden Disc Awards. EXO sold South Korea best-selling album of 2016 with all standard Ex'Act (korean ver) and each of its reissue Ex'Act (chinese ver), Lotto (korean ver) and Lotto (chinese ver) albums selling a total of 1,149,743 units overall.

Weekly charts

Monthly charts

References

External links 
 Gaon Charts - Official Website 

2016
Korea, South albums
2016 in South Korean music